Rize (stylized as RIZE) is a Japanese alternative metal band formed in 1997, debuting in 2000 and currently signed with Warner Music Japan. The band currently consists of Jesse McFaddin (lead vocals/guitar), Nobuaki Kaneko (drums), and KenKen (bass). Their music style is a mix of nu metal, alternative rock, punk rock, hard rock and even some reggae flavor. Their song "ZERO" from Experience album has been featured on Coca-Cola commercial in Japan and Asian countries. Their single "Gunshot" has been featured in Resident Evil: Dead Aim credits.

History

1997–2000: Formation and debut
Rize formed in 1997 with members JESSE, Nobuaki Kaneko and TOKIE. They started performing live concerts in the Shimokitazawa. In 2000, they performed at the 10th Kitazawa Music Festival and, after having been signed to Epic Records Japan, released their debut single "Kaminari". They followed up their debut in November with the hit single "Why I'm Me", with an album being released the same month. However, original member TOKIE left after the album's release, with u:zo joining as the new bassist and Nakao Yoshihiro coming in for guitar.

2001–2006: First nationwide tour and tour outside Japan
The following year proved to be a busy one for Rize. In April, JESSE and Nobuaki became radio personalities for the program All Night Nippon until September. They also performed again at the Kitazawa Music Festival in July, as well as the Rock in Japan Festival, Arabaki Rock Fest and Summer Sonic Festival '01 in August. The band's collaboration with Zeebra, "I CAN'T LIVE WITHOUT MY RADIO", became the theme song for FM Festival. They followed it up with a tour in December called 4City (there were four performances).

In May 2002, Rize appeared on the stage @ MTV Japan event with Oasis, Jay-Z, etc., in September Rize participated in the South Korean field festival 2002Etpfes at the Seoul Olympic Stadium. The event was the largest field festival in history, with over 30,000 people in attendance. On February 13 2003, Resident Evil: Dead Aim came out and Rize's single "Gunshot" was featured in the game's credits. In July 2003, they moved to Los Angeles to tour with Kottonmouth Kings and Phunk Junkeez. In 2005, JESSE formed their own label "Tensaibaka Records". And in July, Rize could successfully perform on the stage of "Live 8" as the opening act, a world-renowned event broadcast in 7 other countries. Their powerful performance was highly praised and left a big impression with the international music community.

In November 2005, bassist u:zo left, with Nobuaki's brother KenKen replacing him. KenKen was made an official member of the band in April 2006. Their first Oricon appearance happened with a cover of "Pink Spider" in November 2006, debuting at No. 8.

2007–present
On the top of the successful performance at "Live 8", in 2007 Rize was invited to perform at "Live Earth" appearing on the stage with Linkin Park, etc., an acclaimed charity live founded by producer Kevin Wall, and former U.S. Vice President Al Gore, where again Rize's outstanding performance brought them international fame.
In same year 2007, Rize released their fifth album Alterna. In October 2007, they released their latest single, "LADY LOVE". Rize released KO, their sixth full-length album, in April 2008. The following month saw the band performing at the hide Memorial Summit, at which they performed their rendition of Pink Spider in tribute. On May 20, the band announced through their official site that Yoshihiro Nakao would be parting ways from Rize, citing creative differences as the main factor in his decision. However, the remaining members were determined to carry on activities as a trio. In June Rize went on their 2008 "T.K.O. Tour" that consisted of 29 shows and in November released a live DVD of the tour "T.K.O.".

In 2010, Jesse paved the road for Rize to release their 7th album Experience. A majority of the tracks from this album were masterminded and produced by Jesse, enabling him to get huge attentions as not only an artist and musician, as a music producer. "Zero," the iconic song of this album, was picked up by Coca-Cola and lead to the collaboration commercial with Hidetoshi Nakata / former famous soccer player and Coca-Cola Zero, which is still being aired across a large part of Asia.

In July 2011, Rize released their 10th debut anniversary, band history and live DVD titled PIECE.

In 2012, Rize transferred to Warner Music.

On July 20, 2019, it was announced that Jesse and KenKen had both been arrested for violation of the Cannabis Control Law. After a month long investigation based on a tip, police raided their homes; Jesse was found in possession of 2.4 grams of marijuana and .09 grams of cocaine, while KenKen had 0.2 grams of marijuana. Both pled guilty and in October 2019 both received prison sentences suspended for three years; KenKen received 6 months, while Jesse received two years. Rize has since been on a hiatus.

Jesse's solo project 
Jesse started the Hip-Hop unit E.D.O., a diverse group of rappers and artists made up of some of his old high school buddies. E.D.O. has puts out numerous single and their first full album Revolvers was big hit among the Japanese Hip-Hop community. In couple of years, members of E.D.O. have ventured off on their own to start solo projects that have brought much attention to Jesse and his Hip-Hop unit. One project in particular that has received spotlight from underground music critics is Jesse's own E.D.O solo project THE BONEZ. A mixture of Jesse's favorite music genres, rock, hip-hop, and electro, THE BONEZ has put out 6 singles, with each having a different music concept from the previous.

Jesse introduced the Japanese music community to the duo, Def Tech. With many major labels turning away their heads to the young pair, in 2001 Jesse decided to take Micro and Shen under his wing and mold them into the multi-platinum artists that they are today. Not only did Jesse create the road to success for Def Tech but he also played a key role as their producer for their first album and helped Def Tech write the hit song "My Way". In 2005, Jesse has launched his own label Tensaibaka Records, where Def Tech, Rize, and E.D.O. have released a majority of their work.

With much under his belt as a successful musician, artist and producer, Jesse has also become one of Japan's leading icon in fashion with his original clothing line S&Co's and clothing shop Takenaka Sound Shop located in his hometown of Togoshi. S&Co's has become a popular brand amongst celebrities, with big names such as Hayato Ichihara being one of its many loyal customers and fans.
Starting in May 2010, led by Jesse, Bring the Hope Project was established. This project is a form of Jesse's manifest to spread the message of "Hope" through music and free live performances. The first Bring the Hope Project Live took place on May 4, 2010, in which many artists and fans gathered to commend in a charity-live to raise hope and awareness for our past, present and future.

Band members 
 Current members
 Jesse McFaddin – vocals, guitar (1997–present)
In addition to singer/rapper, guitarist, he is also proven career as music producer/composer, plus as "Fashion Icon" among youngsters appeared on Sony CM + Vans sponsored their 2009 Live Tour, etc. His father is Japanese musician Char.
 Nobuaki "NK" Kaneko — drums (1997–present)
He is only signature drummer in Japan by Pearl.
 Kensuke "KenKen" Kaneko – bass (2006–present)
He is a recognized session bass player in various kind of collaborations with famous artists including performing @ Muzikmesse. He is Nobuaki's younger brother.

 Former members
 Tokie – bass (1997–2001)
 u:zo – bass (2001–2005)
 Yoshihiro Nakao – guitar (2001–2008)

Timeline

Discography

Studio albums

Singles

Internet/ Digital releases

Compilation albums

DVDs

Music videos

Awards and nominations 
 Japan Gold Disc Award

|-
| 2001
| RIZE
| New Artist of the Year
| 
|}

Space Shower Music Awards

|-
| 2003
| "02"
| Best Directive Shooting Video
| 
|}

Space Shower Music Awards

|-
| 2018
| RIZE 	
| Best Punk/Loud Rock Artist
| Nominee
|}

References

External links 
 Official website

Japanese alternative rock groups
Rap rock groups
Japanese nu metal musical groups
Warner Music Group artists
Musical groups from Setagaya